Michael Frederick Gear (27 November 1934 – 26 January 2018) was Suffragan Bishop of Doncaster.

Gear was educated at St John's College, Durham. Ordained in 1961, he began his career with a curacy at Christ Church, Bexleyheath  was then Vicar of St Andrew, Clubmore, Liverpool; Rector of Avondale, Harare; Rural Dean of Macclesfield; and finally, before his elevation to the episcopate, Archdeacon of Chester. Since retiring to Maidstone Bishop Michael continued to serve the church as an assistant bishop within Canterbury diocese and a trustee of a charity for Zimbabwean street children.

He died on 26 January 2018 at the age of 83.

References

1934 births
2018 deaths
Alumni of St John's College, Durham
20th-century Church of England bishops
Archdeacons of Chester
Bishops of Doncaster
Alumni of Cranmer Hall, Durham